George Gasson (born 15 January 1997) is a Welsh rugby union player who played for the Dragons regional team as a wing. He is was also Wales under-20 international.

Gasson made his debut for the Dragons regional team in 2017 having previously played for Caerphilly RFC, Nelson RFC, the Dragons academy and Bedwas RFC.

In 2018/2019 he played in HSBC's rugby sevens international series for Wales.

References

External links 
Dragons profile 

1997 births
Living people
Bedwas RFC players
Dragons RFC players
Rugby union players from Caerphilly
Welsh rugby union players
Rugby union wings